(French) or  (Dutch), often simply called Molenbeek, is one of the 19 municipalities of the Brussels-Capital Region, Belgium. Located in the western part of the region, it is bordered by the City of Brussels, from which it is separated by the Brussels–Charleroi Canal, as well as by the municipalities of Anderlecht, Berchem-Sainte-Agathe, Dilbeek, Jette, and Koekelberg. The Molenbeek brook, from which it takes its name, flows through the municipality. In common with all of Brussels' municipalities, it is legally bilingual (French–Dutch).

From its origins in the Middle Ages until the 18th century, Molenbeek was a rural village on the edge of Brussels, but around the turn of the 19th century, it experienced major growth brought on by a boom in commerce and manufacturing during the Industrial Revolution. Its prosperity declined after the Second World War, owing to deindustrialisation, leading to extensive investment and regeneration. Knowing a strong movement of immigration, mainly Moroccan, from the 1950s and 1960s, Molenbeek became increasingly multicultural with a minority Muslim population. In the early 21st century, it gained international attention as the base of Islamist terrorists who carried out attacks in both Paris and Brussels. Nowadays, it is a mostly residential municipality consisting of several historically and architecturally distinct districts.

, the municipality had a population of 97,697 inhabitants. Its upper area is greener and less densely populated.

Toponymy

Etymology

It is a very common name for brooks in the Netherlands and Belgium, such as the Molenbeek (Erpe-Mere Bovenschelde), as well as the Molenbeek-Ter Erpenbeek, both in the Denderstreek, Belgium.

Although first applied to the brook that ran through the village, the name Molenbeek (originally spelled Molembecca) eventually came to be used to designate the village itself, around the year 985.

Pronunciation
In French,  is pronounced  (the "-beek" is pronounced with a long "a", like "bake" in English), and in Dutch,  is pronounced . The dialectal forms Muilebeik and Meulebeik are still used by older adults of Belgian ancestry, whilst the abbreviations Molen and Molem are common among younger speakers.

History

Rural beginnings
As early as the 9th century, Molenbeek was the site of a church dedicated to Saint John the Baptist. The parish boundaries of St. John's Church were much greater than today, reaching as far as the river Senne, and from the end of the 12th century, included a chapel dedicated to Saint Catherine. This chapel was split off from the rest of the parish following the construction of Brussels' second city walls and gradually became the current St. Catherine's Church in the / neighbourhood of Brussels. The first documented mention of Molenbeek was made on 9 April 1174 in a papal bull by Pope Alexander III listing the property of the chapter of the Collegiate Church of St. Michael and St. Gudula (now a cathedral) in Brussels, which included St. John's Church, as well as other property. The Brussels Beguinage, founded before 1247 outside the city walls, also depended on Molenbeek.

[[File:Saint John’s Dancers in Molenbeeck’ (1592) by Pieter Brueghel II.jpg|left|thumb|Saint John's Dancers in Molenbeeck''', Pieter Brueghel the Younger, 1592]]

In the early Middle Ages, Molenbeek was known for its miraculous spring of Saint Gertrude of Nivelles, the mythical founder of Nivelles Abbey, which attracted thousands of pilgrims. According to legend, she visited Molenbeek and offered the land on which the village's first church was built, and allegedly caused this sacred spring to spur out by ramming her abbess's crosier into the ground near the church. Later, the tradition of a special pilgrimage for patients with epilepsy developed around St. John's Church. On St. John's Day (24 June), a dancing procession took place, in which epileptics could be freed from their illness for a year if they crossed a bridge over the Molenbeek brook towards the church without their feet touching the ground. A painting by Pieter Brueghel the Younger, dating from 1592, illustrates this procession.

Molenbeek was made part of Brussels in the 13th century. As a result, the agricultural village lost a lot of its land to its more powerful neighbour. In addition, St. John's Church was dismantled in 1578 during the Calvinist Republic of Brussels, which lasted from 1577 to 1585, leading to further decline, though it was later rebuilt on the same spot. The town's aspect remained mostly rural until the 18th century.

Industrialisation

At the end of the 18th century, the Industrial Revolution brought prosperity back to Molenbeek through commerce and manufacturing. In 1785, the town regained its status as an independent municipality. Around that time, Molenbeek experienced its first wave of urbanisation with the constructions of streets in the neighbourhoods to the immediate west of the City of Brussels, such as the /, the /, the /, and the current /.

During the first quarter of the 19th century, several hundred workers were employed in Molenbeek's chemical and textile industries. In total, there were fifty companies in Molenbeek in 1829. The opening of the Brussels–Charleroi Canal in 1832 greatly increased the traffic of coal and thus the mechanisation of industry, which led to the development of foundries, engineering and metalworking companies in the municipality. Attracted by the industrial opportunities, many workers moved in, first from the other Belgian provinces (mainly rural residents from Flanders) and France, then from Southern European, and more recently from Eastern European and African countries.

The growth of the community continued unabated throughout the 19th century, leading to cramped living conditions, especially near the canal. In that period, Molenbeek was dubbed the Little Manchester or the Belgian Manchester, in reference to the Northern English city that led the history of industrialisation. On 5 May 1835, Molenbeek was the departure site of the first passenger train in continental Europe. At the end of the 19th century, Brussels annexed and reintegrated the canal area within its new port, which was thus lost to Molenbeek.

20th century
Until the early 20th century, Molenbeek was a booming suburb which attracted a large working-class population. Remarkable new urban developments and garden cities such as the Cité Diongre were built at the beginning of the century to house the influx of newcomers. The Church of St. John the Baptist was also rebuilt between 1930 and 1932 in Art Deco style to accommodate this growing populace. The industrial decline, however, which had already started before World War I, accelerated after the Great Depression and World War II.

Following the industrial decline after the war, the old districts bordering the City of Brussels began to decrease in population. Much of the original Belgian working-class population, when its financial means allowed it, left the lower Molenbeek for Brussels' newly developing suburbs. In this lower part of the town, new immigrant populations moved in, leading to the present-day urban fabric. The depopulation was not addressed until the 1960s through the construction of new residential areas in the then-rural west of the municipality. In the 1990s, this expansion was halted, leaving some woods and meadows in Molenbeek, such as the semi-natural site of the Scheutbos.

Where Molenbeek was once a centre of intense industrial activity, concentrated around the canal and the railway, most of those industries have disappeared to make way for large-scale urban renewal following the modernist Athens Charter, such as the Tour L'Écluse along the / in the upper town and the Tour Brunfaut near the canal. In addition, clearance work for the extension of the metro in the 1970s and 1980s led to further destruction. In spite of this, Molenbeek has maintained its character to this day. This industrial past is still remembered in Brussels' Museum of Industry and Labour, a museum of social and industrial history built on the site of the former foundry of the Compagnie des Bronzes de Bruxelles.

21st century
In some areas of Molenbeek, the ensuing poverty left its mark on the urban landscape and scarred the social life of the community, leading to rising crime rates and pervading cultural intolerance. Various local revitalisation programmes are currently under way, aiming at relieving the most impoverished districts of the municipality. Currently, the local economy is renewing itself, but it is "dominated" by the administrative sector. Alongside large companies such as KBC Bank and the distribution company Delhaize, there are administrations such as that of the Ministry of the French Community and numerous businesses.

Attempts at revitalising the municipality have, however, not always been successful. In June 2011, the multinational company BBDO, citing over 150 attacks on their staff by locals, posted an open letter to then-mayor Philippe Moureaux, announcing its withdrawal from the municipality. As a result, serious questions were raised about governance, security and the administration of Moureaux. Following a general decrease in crime, the company finally decided to remain in Molenbeek.

Terrorism
According to Le Monde, the assassins who killed anti-Taliban commander Ahmed Shah Massoud both came from Molenbeek. Hassan el-Haski, one of the 2004 Madrid terror bombers, came from Molenbeek. The perpetrator of the Jewish Museum of Belgium shooting, Mehdi Nemmouche, lived in Molenbeek for a time. Ayoub El Khazzani, the perpetrator of the 2015 Thalys train attack, stayed with his sister in Molenbeek. French police believe the weapons used in the Porte de Vincennes siege two days after the Charlie Hebdo shooting were sourced from Molenbeek. The bombers of the November 2015 Paris attacks were also traced to Molenbeek; during the Molenbeek capture of Salah Abdeslam, an accomplice of the Paris bombers, protesters "threw stones and bottles at police and press during the arrest", stated the then-Interior Minister of Belgium, Jan Jambon. Oussama Zariouh, the bomber of Brussels Central Station in June 2017, lived in Molenbeek.

November 2015 Paris attacks

At least four of the terrorists in the November 2015 Paris attacks—the brothers Brahim and Salah Abdeslam, alleged accomplice Mohamed Abrini, and the alleged mastermind Abdelhamid Abaaoud—grew up and lived in Molenbeek. According to former French President François Hollande, that was also where they organised the attacks. On 18 March 2016, Salah Abdeslam, a suspected accomplice in those attacks, was captured in two anti-terrorist raids in Molenbeek that killed another suspect and injured two others. At least one other suspect remains at large. Ibrahim (born 9 October 1986 in Brussels) was involved in the attempted robbery of a currency exchange office in January 2010, where he shot at police with a Kalashnikov rifle. The then-mayor of Brussels, Freddy Thielemans, and the then-mayor of Molenbeek, Philippe Moureaux, described the shooting as a "" (a small daily news item) and "normal in a large city", causing controversy.

Police investigation
Since several of the attackers in the Brussels and Paris terrorist attacks had connections to the area, Belgian police started door-to-door checks in which a quarter of Molenbeek's inhabitants were investigated, a total of 22,668. This operation resulted in that of the 1,600 organisations investigated, 102 were found to be involved with crime and a further 52 were involved with terrorism. 72 individuals were found to have a terrorist connection and were subject to future surveillance.

Geography

Location

It is the third westernmost municipality in the Brussels-Capital Region after Anderlecht and Berchem-Sainte-Agathe and is an important crossing point for the Brussels–Charleroi Canal, which borders the municipality to the east. It is bordered by the Brussels municipalities of Anderlecht, Berchem-Sainte-Agathe, Jette and Koekelberg, as well as the Flemish municipality of Dilbeek.

Climate
Molenbeek, in common with the rest of Brussels, experiences an oceanic climate (Köppen: Cfb) with warm summers and cool winters. Proximity to coastal areas influences the area's climate by sending marine air masses from the Atlantic Ocean. Nearby wetlands also ensure a maritime temperate climate. On average (based on measurements in the period 1981–2010), there are approximately 135 days of rain per year in the region. Snowfall is infrequent, averaging 24 days per year. It also often experiences violent thunderstorms in summer months.

The Royal Meteorological Institute of Belgium (IRM/KMI) is located in Uccle, in the south of Brussels. The meteorological records which are carried out there are similar to those which could be carried out in Molenbeek.

Districts

There are two distinct areas in Molenbeek; a lower area and an upper area. The lower area, next to the canal, consists of working-class, predominantly migrant, communities, mostly of Moroccan (mainly Riffian and Berber) descent, with many being second- and third-generation. The upper area, close to the Greater Ring (Brussels' second ring road), features newer construction and is mostly middle-class and residential.

The territory of Molenbeek is very heterogeneous and is characterised by a mixture of larger districts including smaller residential and (formerly) industrial neighbourhoods.

Lower Molenbeek

Historical centre

The historical centre of Molenbeek is the municipality's central district. It developed during the Industrial Revolution along the Brussels–Charleroi Canal and is currently in a fragile social and economic situation due to the decline of its economy and the poor quality of some of its housing. The Municipal Hall of Molenbeek is located on the /, at the heart of this district.

Duchesse (Quatre-vents)

Located to the south of the historical centre of Molenbeek, this district is centred on the /. The square was created in 1847 on the grounds of the Hospices de Bruxelles, of which only the neoclassical facade remains. The hospice buildings now house a primary school (municipal school no. 5). In 1869, the Church of St. Barbara was erected there for the Catholic worship of the new parish. The /, the /, the /, the / and the / also end there.

Heyvaert
Located in the south-east of Molenbeek, near the Abattoirs of Anderlecht (the main slaughterhouse in Brussels) and along the Charleroi Canal, Heyvaert is part of the larger / district and is bounded by the /, the Rue de Birmingham, the Place de la Duchesse de Brabant, the Rue Isidoor Teirlinck, the /, and the / (formerly the /, because of its proximity to the canal lock;  meaning "lock" in French).

Maritime

Located in the north of Molenbeek, the Maritime district was born, around 1900, from the implementation of the Port of Brussels and the Maritime Station, a freight station on the Tour & Taxis site. A number of customs agencies and handling activities mingled with homes have given the neighbourhood a diverse character. The residents, historically made up of workers, as well as of the small and large bourgeoisie, were also from the outset of great diversity.

Upper Molenbeek

Karreveld
Today, it is a mostly residential neighbourhood between the /, the / and the railroad.

Korenbeek
Located in the north-east of Molenbeek, Korenbeek is home to Molenbeek Cemetery between the Chaussée de Gand and the /. This cemetery was inaugurated on 16 August 1864 to replace the old parish cemetery around the Church of St. John the Baptist, which had become too small, and whose last remains were cleared in 1932.

Machtens (Marie-José)

Located in the upper part of Molenbeek, this district is located in the valley of the Maalbeek (or Molenbeek) that gave the municipality its name. Originally, the area was part of the former Oostendaal estate. In 1920, it was purchased by the municipality and partly turned into two parks; Albert Park and Marie-José Park, in the triangle formed by the /, the / and the /. They were designed by the architect and urban planner Louis Van der Swaelmen, and are named after King Albert I and his daughter, Princess Marie-José, the last Queen of Italy.

Osseghem/Ossegem
/ is centrally located in the upper part of Molenbeek, west of the municipality's historical centre. The neighbourhood used to be a rural hamlet. The name is of Germanic origin and is composed of Odso + -inga + gem, meaning "residence of the people of Odso". An old country road, today's /, which led to the Chaussée de Gand near the current Osseghem/Ossegem metro station, connected the hamlet to Molenbeek and Brussels.

Scheutbos (Mettewie)
Located in the extreme west of Molenbeek, near the Boulevard Louis Mettewie, the Scheutbos (or Scheutbosch) is the municipality's remaining "green" area, home to the likewise named semi-natural site of the Scheutbos.

Main sights

Molenbeek-Saint-Jean has a rich cultural and architectural heritage. Some of the main points of interest include:
 The Municipal Hall of Molenbeek, located on the /, designed in eclectic style by the architect Jean-Baptiste Janssens, which was opened in 1889.
 The Church of St. John the Baptist, a Catholic parish church designed in Art Deco style by the architect  and built in 1931–32, which has been listed as a protected monument since 1984.
 The Church of St. Remigius, located on the /, a neo-Gothic building completed in 1907.
 The Church of St. Barbara, located on the /, another neo-Gothic building completed in 1894 and listed since 1998.
 Molenbeek Cemetery, which contains remarkable monuments, including funerary galleries and a columbarium built in 1880.
 The Karreveld Castle and surrounding park which are used for cultural events and the meetings of the municipal council. At the beginning of the 20th century, it was one of the birth places of Belgian Cinema. At the request of Charles Pathé (Pathé Cinéma), the director Alfred Machin commissioned the first film studio in the country, together with a workshop for the construction of film sets and a mini zoological garden for exotic animals, such as bears, camels and panthers used as 'extras' in films. Several films, including the first two Belgian feature films La Fille de Delft and the sadly prophetic Maudite soit la guerre (in hand-painted colours) were shot by Alfred Machin in the studio of the Karreveld Castle.
 The Municipal Museum of Molenbeek (MoMuse), housed in the prestigious building of the Academy of Drawing and Visual Arts.
 The Vaartkapoen statue, on the /.

Moreover, several rundown industrial buildings have been renovated and converted into prime real estate and other community functions. Examples include:
 The Fonderie, a former smelter of the Compagnie des Bronzes de Bruxelles, operational from 1854 to 1979, now home to Brussels' Museum of Industry and Labour. The museum focuses on the industry, coupled with the social history of Molenbeek, and the impact of industrialisation on the development of the municipality.
 The Raffinerie, a former sugar refinery, now the site of a cultural and modern dance complex.
 The Bottelarij, a bottling plant that housed the Royal Flemish Theatre during its renovation in the centre of Brussels.
 The Millennium Iconoclast Museum of Art (MIMA), a museum dedicated to culture 2.0 and to urban art opened in April 2016, in the former buildings of the Belle-Vue brewery, and is the first of the kind in Europe.
 The impressive buildings of the former goods station of Tour & Taxis and the surrounding area bordering the municipality, which will be turned into residences, as well as commercial enterprises.
 Brussels' Circus School, installed in the buildings of Tour & Taxis.

Demographics

Historical population
Historically, the population of Molenbeek was quite low. The municipality counted fewer than 2,000 inhabitants at the beginning of the 19th century. However, following the Industrial Revolution, the population underwent a remarkable growth, peaking at 72,783 in 1910. From then, it began to decrease slightly during the first half of the 20th century to a low of 63,528 in 1961, before increasing again rapidly in recent years.

, the population was 97,979. The population is relatively young—the average age is 35 years—with nearly 29% under 18 years old, and fewer than 12% over 65. This population, while already impoverished and overcrowded, has further increased by 24.5% in the last decade.

 Sources: INS: 1806 to 1981= census; 1990 and later = population on 1 January

Foreign population
The population has been described as "mainly Muslim" in the media; however, actual figures are estimated to range between 25% and 40%, depending on the catchment area. Belgium does not collect statistics by ethnic background or religious beliefs, so exact figures are unknown. An October, 2020 news story reports thus "Molenbeek, which has a large Muslim population, has become notorious as a radical hotbed.".

, there is one main minority group in Molenbeek, Belgian Moroccans. That year, Françoise Schepmans, then-mayor of Molenbeek, stated that the lack of diversity in the foreign population of Molenbeek and the fact they are all clustered in the same area is a problem. Nearly 40% of young people in Molenbeek are unemployed. The municipality lies in a semi-circle of neighbourhoods in Brussels often referred to as the "poor croissant".

Migrant communities in Molenbeek with over 1,000 people as of 1 January 2020:

Politics
Molenbeek is governed by an elected municipal council and an executive college of the mayor and aldermen. The longtime mayor from 1992 to 2012 was Philippe Moureaux (PS). Following the Belgian local elections, 2012, an alternative majority was formed headed by then-mayor Françoise Schepmans (MR) and consisting of MR (15 seats), CDH-CD&V (6 seats) and Ecolo-Groen (4 seats). The Socialist Party (16 seats) became the opposition next to the Workers' Party of Belgium (PTB), Democratic Federalist Independent (DéFI), the ISLAM party and the New Flemish Alliance (N-VA), each having one seat.

The 2018 local elections saw PS return to the majority, with a coalition between the aforementioned and MR being agreed upon.  is the current mayor.

Mayors

Historical list of mayors or burgomasters of Molenbeek:
 1800–1812: J.-B. De Roy
 1812–1818: FR. De Putte
 1818–1819: V. Van Espen
 1819–1830: F. Vanderdussen
 1830–1836: Ch. Deroy
 1836–1842: P.-J. Meeüs
 1843–1848: A. Vander Kindere
 1848–1860: H.-J.-L. Stevens
 1861–1863: J.-B. De Bauche
 1864–1875: L.-A. De Cock
 1876–1878: G. Mommaerts
 1879–1911: Henri Hollevoet (liberal)
 1914–1938: Louis Mettewie (liberal)
 1939–1978: Edmond Machtens (PSB)
 1978–1988: Marcel Piccart (PS, later FDF)
 1988–1992: Léon Spiegels (PRL)
 1992–2012: Philippe Moureaux (PS)
 2013–2018: Françoise Schepmans (MR)
 2018–present: Catherine Moureaux (PS)

Sports

As in the rest of Brussels, sport in Molenbeek is under the responsibility of the Communities. The  (ADEPS) is responsible for recognising the various French-speaking sports federations.

Football

Molenbeek's historical football club, Racing White Daring Molenbeek, often referred to as RWDM, was very popular until its dissolution in 2002. Its successor, R.W.D.M. Brussels F.C., used to play in the Belgian first division. It folded at the end of 2012–13 as a member of the Belgian Second Division. Since 2015, its reincarnation, RWDM47, is back playing in the fourth division. The club's home stadium is the Edmond Machtens Stadium.

Other sports
The municipality is home to the Royal Daring Hockey Club Molenbeek, a field hockey club.

Education
Most of Molenbeek pupils between the ages of 3 and 18 go to schools organised by the French-speaking Community or the Flemish Community.

 Primary education 
There are 17 French-language and six Dutch-language primary schools in Molenbeek.

 Secondary education 
 Athénée royal Serge Creuz (French-speaking) 
 Athaneum Toverfluit (Dutch-speaking)

Transportation

Road network
The / in the north of Molenbeek is part of a monumental east–west axis, at the end of which is the National Basilica of the Sacred Heart in Koekelberg. Some other main roads that cross the municipality are the /, the / and the / running east–west, as well as the / running north–south.

Public transport
Molenbeek is served by Brussels' metro lines 1, 2, 5 and 6, with Comte de Flandre/Graaf van Vlaanderen, Étangs Noirs/Zwarte Vijvers, Osseghem/Ossegem, Belgica, Beekkant, Gare de l'Ouest/Weststation (Brussels-West Station), and Ribaucourt stations. Brussels-West and Beekkant are connected to all the metro lines and are multimodal transport hubs in western Brussels. The former will also gain importance in the framework of the Brussels Regional Express Network (RER/GEN)'s development, which will connect the capital and surrounding towns. Additionally, a comprehensive bus and tram service links Molenbeek to other parts of the region. The municipality also has a number Villo! public bicycle stations on its territory.

Waterways
Molenbeek is on the route of the second largest axis of the Belgian network of inland waterways, that is the Antwerp–Brussels–Charleroi axis via the maritime Scheldt, the Maritime Canal and the Brussels–Charleroi Canal.

Parks and green spaces

Green spaces in the municipality include:
 Scheutbos Park, a regional nature park of 
 Semi-natural site of the Scheutbos, a protected area of 
 Karreveld Park 
 Marie-José Park 
 Albert Park
 Muses' Park
 Hauwaert Park
 Bonnevie Park
 Fonderie Park

Notable inhabitants

 Salah Abdeslam (b. 1989), French jihadist terrorist involved in the November 2015 Paris attacks
 Montasser AlDe'emeh (b. 1989), Belgian-Palestinian researcher
  (1913–1999), politician, senator, and mayor of Jette, was born there.
  (Norbert Benoit Van Peperstaete) (1910–1993), filmmaker
  (1856–1943), politician, author, and Minister of State
  (b. 1928), artist
  (1924–1996), painter
  (1908–1986), musician
 Eugène Demolder (1862–1919), writer
  (1878–1963), modernist architect
  (1898–1949), professor at the Brussels Conservatory, violinist and teacher of the violinist Arthur Grumiaux
  (1877–1962), architect of the Citroën building (now part of KANAL - Centre Pompidou), was born there.
 Ferdinand Elbers (1862–1943), mechanic, trade unionist, politician, and senator
  (1906–1997), politician
  (1839–1923), founder of the newspaper La Pensée'', leader of the Belgian freethinking movement and co-founder of the Socialist International
  (1899–1984), actor, was born there.
 Eugène Laermans (1864–1940), painter and engraver
 , Esq. (1881–1957), politician, senator, and mayor of Itterbeek, was born there.
 Marka, Serge Van Laeken (b. 1961), singer, songwriter, composer and filmmaker
  (1793–1873), industrialist, politician, mayor of Neder-over-Heembeek in 1830 and Molenbeek from 1836 to 1842, registrar of the Court of Audit from 1831 to 1836, decorated with the Belgian Iron Cross. He lived at 7, Faubourg de Flandre.
  (1870-1935), painter
 , also known as Norge (1898–1990), poet
 Philippe Moureaux (1939–2018), politician, senator, mayor of Molenbeek, and Professor of Economic History at the Université libre de Bruxelles (ULB)
  (1845–1915), geologist, palaeontologist, and curator of the Museum of Natural Sciences of Belgium
  (1924–1988), writer
 Zeynep Sever (b. 1989), Miss Belgium 2008
  (1912–1997), architect and painter
  (1889–1978), war pilot, aircraft manufacturer including of the famous Stampe SV-4
 Eric Struelens (b. 1969), professional basketball player
 Herman Teirlinck (1879–1967), writer
 Pierre Tetar van Elven (1828–1908), painter
 Toots Thielemans (1922–2016), jazz artist
 Henri Joseph Thomas (1878–1972), painter
 Pierre Van Humbeeck (1829–1890), politician and Minister of Education
 Leon Vanderkindere (1842–1906), historian and prominent professor at the Free University of Brussels, was born there.
 Philippe Vandermaelen (1795–1869), world-renowned geographer and cartographer. He founded the geographical establishment of Brussels in Molenbeek.
 Franky Vercauteren (b. 1956), Belgian football personality
  (1874–1962), painter, was born there.
 Thierry Zéno (1950–2017), author-filmmaker

International relations

Twin towns and sister cities
Molenbeek is twinned with:
  Oujda, Morocco
  Levallois-Perret, France

References

Notes

Bibliography

Further reading

External links

  

Molenbeek-Saint-Jean
Municipalities of the Brussels-Capital Region
Populated places in Belgium
Islam in Belgium
Moroccan diaspora in Europe